The following are the national records in Olympic weightlifting in Switzerland. Records are maintained in each weight class for the snatch lift, clean and jerk lift, and the total for both lifts by the Swiss Amateur Weightlifting Federation (Schweizerischer Amateur Gewichtheber Verband / Fédération Suisse d'Haltérophilie Amateur).

Current records

Men

Women

Historical records

Men (1998–2018)

Women (1998–2018)

References
General
Swiss records 
Specific

External links
SAGV-FSHA web site

Records
Switzerland
Olympic weightlifting
weightlifting